William Gerard Dwyer (born 1947) is an American  mathematician specializing in algebraic topology and group theory. For many years he was a professor at the University of Notre Dame, where he is the William J. Hank Family Professor Emeritus.

Life 

He was born in 1947 in Jersey City, New Jersey.

Career 

Dwyer completed his B.A. at Boston College in 1969.

He completed his Ph.D. at the Massachusetts Institute of Technology in 1973. His doctoral thesis was on Strong Convergence of the Eilenberg-Moore Spectral Sequence and his doctoral advisor was Daniel Kan. Afterwards he taught at Yale University and visited the Institute for Advanced Study in Princeton, New Jersey before joining the faculty at  the University of Notre Dame.

In 1998 Dwyer was an invited speaker at the International Congress of Mathematicians in Berlin. In 2007 he was awarded a Doctor Honoris Causa degree by the University of Warsaw.  He was elected a Fellow of the American Mathematical Society in 2012.  He is currently emeritus professor of mathematics at the University of Notre Dame.

Publications

References

External links
 (See operad.)

20th-century American mathematicians
21st-century American mathematicians
1947 births
Living people
People from Jersey City, New Jersey
Mathematicians from New Jersey
Topologists
Massachusetts Institute of Technology School of Science alumni
University of Notre Dame faculty
Fellows of the American Mathematical Society
Boston College alumni